Juliet Sekabunga Nalwanga is a physician from Uganda, who is the country's first female neurosurgeon. As of 2021 she was one of only thirteen neurosurgeons in Uganda. As of 2018 she was employed by Mulago National Referral Hospital in Kampala.

Background and education
She is Ugandan by birth. Her father is the late Professor Sekabunga, a well-known pediatric surgeon, who practiced at Mulago National Referral Hospital in the 1970s and 1980s. She also had a maternal aunt who was a physician. She credits that aunt for paying her school fees and being the inspiration to pursue medicine as a career.

She went on to study medicine at Mbarara University, followed by internships at the same institution, and at Lira Regional Referral Hospital. She returned to Mbarara University to pursue a Master of Medicine degree in Surgery, the first woman to do so. She was then admitted to Makerere University to pursue a neurosurgical residency at Mulago National Referral Hospital, graduating in 2018. She then spent a year specialising in paediatric neurosurgery at The Hospital for Sick Children, the teaching hospital of the University of Toronto Faculty of Medicine, in Toronto, Canada. One of her Ugandan mentors was the late John Baptist Mukasa (1967 - 2021).

Career
Following the completion of her neurosurgery fellowship in Toronto, Canada, she returned to Uganda and took up employment at Mulago National Referral Hospital as a consultant pediatric neurosurgeon and as an assistant lecturer in neurosurgery at Makerere University School of Medicine.

References

External links
 Juliet Sekabunga, neurosurgeon, discusses the principles of managing traumatic brain injury

Living people
Year of birth missing (living people)
Ugandan women surgeons
Women neuroscientists
Ugandan neurosurgeons
21st-century women physicians
Mbarara University alumni
Makerere University alumni
University of Toronto alumni